Baadasssss! is a 2003 American biographical drama film, written, produced, directed by, and starring Mario Van Peebles. The film is based on the struggles of Van Peebles' father Melvin Van Peebles (played by Mario himself), as he attempts to film and distribute Sweet Sweetback's Baadasssss Song, a film that was widely credited with showing Hollywood that a viable African-American audience existed, and thus influencing the creation of the Blaxploitation genre. The film also stars Joy Bryant, Nia Long, Ossie Davis, Paul Rodriguez, Rainn Wilson, and Terry Crews.

Cast
 Mario Van Peebles as Melvin Van Peebles, Melvin (played by his real-life son, Mario), has recently found success with his film Watermelon Man. Although offered a three-picture contract by Columbia Pictures, Melvin is pushed by his agent, Howie Kaufman, to follow up with a comedy. Disgusted by the mainstream cinematic portrayal of African-Americans as either villains or comic relief, Melvin decides to make a film with "ghetto realism" to portray the Black community as he knows it. This is underscored in Sweetback'''s opening credits, with the line "Starring: The Black Community".
 Melvin as himself also appears in a cameo.
 Adam West as Bert, one of the first investors Melvin visits to finance his film; Melvin manages to get a meeting with this man through his friend Bill. The meeting at Bert's beach house goes well at first, with Bert commenting that Melvin's stubbornness is much like his own. Bert also marks it as an attribute that shows Melvin is different, with a vision that he will not compromise for the sake of following the status quo. Later on, though, Melvin decides not to go through with the business partnership when Bert uncovers himself and comes on to Melvin, inviting him to swim together. 
 David Alan Grier as Clyde Houston, Melvin, at first, has no idea how he will be able to produce his film without being shut down. Upon passing an adult theatre, he comes up with the idea to disguise the movie as a black porno, thereby enabling it to pass any scrutiny that would keep it from production. Sitting in on a movie, Melvin notices the name "Clyde Houston" repeatedly appears in the credits. Seeking him out, Melvin hires Clyde, another African-American in the film industry, to be his production manager. However, during production, due to mounting stress, Melvin fires Clyde.
 Glenn Plummer as Angry Brother, at the casting call for the lead role of Sweetback, this character shows up and delivers the line with a major stutter. Although he is mocked by the other auditionees, Melvin embraces the man's stutter as "real" and casts him in another role. When the time comes to shoot the scene, though, the actor is shown to have taken speech classes, getting rid of his speech impediment. The situation is easily remedied, though, when Melvin takes the actor's gun from him. In his angered and flustered state, his stutter returns and the scene is shot without a problem.
 John Singleton as "Detroit J"
 Joy Bryant as Priscilla, Melvin's young, ambitious secretary. Every time she enters the room to notify Melvin or give him some important information, she turns it into an audition, promoting herself all the time to be in his movie. Although Melvin relents and gives her a role, she ends up turning down the part because her boyfriend does not approve. Although this proves to be a minor setback, it is Priscilla that recommends her boyfriend, Maurice, to Melvin to get his group Earth, Wind, & Fire, to do the music for the movie.
 Karimah Westbrook as Ginnie, Melvin first meets Ginnie at a party hosted by Bill, and they sleep together. Although she appears to be minor at first, Melvin later calls her to be in the movie. After Priscilla quits, Melvin is desperate to cast Ginnie in an early scene of the movie. Although she initially believes it to be an erotic piece, threatening to leave the set and throwing another obstacle in Melvin's path, Melvin manages to convince her of its true purpose, to create something that portrays Blacks with an eye to reality instead of in a continually subservient role. After being convinced, along with some money upfront, Ginnie is convinced to star.
 Khalil Kain as Maurice, Priscilla's Boyfriend, and a member of the (at-the-time) fledging R&B group Earth, Wind & Fire. His initial action is to restrict Priscilla from acting in the movie, but he, with his group, later create the soundtrack with Melvin. Their production is spurred on by a $500 check Melvin cuts them, even though it ends up bouncing when they try to cash it.
 Khleo Thomas as Mario, young Mario has a role in the film as the child Sweetback.
 Len Lesser as Manny Goldberg / Mort Goldberg, twin owners of one of two theaters that picks up Sweetback, they first plan to show it between two other films as part of a triple-feature. Melvin, wanting to impress upon them the film's importance, wagers two tailored suits in order to get them to show the movie by itself. Although this move may be seen as one of either supreme confidence or supreme desperation, it pays off, as the film garners much more attendance and revenue for the owners than they previously had.
 Nia Long as Sandra, Melvin's girlfriend helps him manage his children throughout production. Although she has not grown up with such a clear view of the oppression faced by African-Americans of the time, she is still extremely supportive of Melvin's undertaking.
 Ossie Davis as Granddad, Albeit a gruff figure, he too helps Melvin take care of his children and also appears in minor role.
 Paul Rodriguez as Jose Garcia, Puerto Rican cameraman, Jose acts as a symbol of the unifying nature of not just the film, but its creation as well.
 Penny Bae Bridges as Megan Van Peebles, one of Melvin's children, acting in a minor role in the film.
 Rainn Wilson as Bill Harris, Melvin's friend who tries but fails to acquire financial backing for the film. Even though the film ends up being independently financed by Melvin himself, with the help of Bill Cosby, Bill stays on the crew to assist production.
 Saul Rubinek as Howie Kaufman, Melvin's agent, Howie pushes Melvin to sign a contract with Columbia Pictures. Although Melvin does not end up doing so, Howie helps Melvin post-production in finding distributors for the film. Although Howie is his agent, he is far from being solely after money, as evidenced by the close relationship he has with Melvin's kids.
 Terry Crews as "Big T", crew member that acts as sound assistant and security for the crew, Big T ends up being part of the group that is arrested by the cops for alleged theft. Although he almost leaves, threatening Melvin in the process, he is convinced to stay after an impassioned speech by Melvin that shows him the importance of the film to the community.
 T. K. Carter as Bill Cosby, while not delivering a major number of lines, ends up loaning Melvin $50,000 to finish production, with the only stipulation being that he gets his money back. His contribution brings yet more emphasis on the film's recognized importance by all its cast and crew.
Cosby as himself also appears in a cameo.
 Vincent Schiavelli as Jerry, Cinemation employee who initially manages to distribute Sweetback to two theaters across America.
 Wesley Jonathan as "Panther", although seen leaving midway through a showing, he returns with 22 other members of the Black Panthers. Recognizing the revolutionary film to be of immense cultural substance, he helps bring crowds to the film, even though it stands on its own as opposed to being a part of a greater number of movies.

Reception
The film received mostly positive reviews.   Roger Ebert of the Chicago Sun-Times named it one of the best films of the year. Baadasssss! was nominated for several "best of" Independent Spirit and NAACP Image awards for 2005, including best feature, director, actor and screenplay. It was listed in the African-American Film Critics Association's top-ten films of 2004and won best feature film at the 2004 Philadelphia Film Festival. However, the film ended up being a commercial failure, making less than $400,000 at the box office during its limited theatrical release. Leonard Maltin lists the movie in his book 151 Best Movies You've Never Seen'' and he writes "Mario Van Peebles has written, directed, and starred in a number of films over the years but this is his most personal piece of work-and I think his best."

Awards and nominations
2004 Gijón International Film Festival
Best Feature – Mario Van Peebles (nominated)

2004 Philadelphia Film Festival
Best Feature Film – Mario Van Peebles (winner)

2005 Black Reel Awards
Best Actor, Drama – Mario Van Peebles (nominated)
Best Director – Mario Van Pebbles (winner)
Best Film, Drama (nominated)
Best Screenplay, Original or Adapted – Mario Van Peebles (winner)
Best Supporting Actress – Joy Bryant (nominated)

20th Independent Spirit Awards
Best Director – Mario Van Peebles (nominated)
Best Feature – Mario Van Peebles (nominated)
Best Screenplay – Dennis Haggerty, Mario Van Peebles (nominated)

36th NAACP Image Awards
Outstanding Actor in a Motion Picture – Mario Van Peebles (nominated)
Outstanding Independent or Foreign Film (nominated)

Soundtrack
A soundtrack album was released by the label Barely Breaking Even.

References

External links
 

2003 films
2003 biographical drama films
2003 independent films
African-American biographical dramas
African-American films
2000s English-language films
American docudrama films
Films about filmmaking
Films about film directors and producers
Films about films
American films based on actual events
Films set in 1970
Films set in 1971
Films set in Los Angeles
Films set in Detroit
Novels by Melvin Van Peebles
Films directed by Mario Van Peebles
Films scored by Tyler Bates
2003 drama films
Sony Pictures Classics films
2000s American films